Hillsboro Township (T8N R4W) is located in Montgomery County, Illinois, United States. The population was 5,515 at the 2000 census.

Adjacent townships
 Butler Grove Township (north)
 Irving Township (northeast)
 East Fork Township (east & southeast)
 Grisham Township (south)
 Walshville Township (southwest)
 South Litchfield Township (west)
 North Litchfield Township (northwest)

External links 
US Census
City-data.com
Illinois State Archives
Historical Society of Montgomery County

Townships in Montgomery County, Illinois
1872 establishments in Illinois
Townships in Illinois